Tweedieia is a genus of crabs in the family Xanthidae, containing the following species:

 Tweedieia brevidactyla Dai & Yang, 1998
 Tweedieia laysani (Rathbun, 1906)
 Tweedieia odhneri (Gordon, 1934)

References

Xanthoidea